Paul Henry Hopes (born 4 August 1960), known professionally as Paul Henry, is a New Zealand radio and television broadcaster who was the host of the late night show The Paul Henry Show on New Zealand's TV3 which ended December 2014 so that Henry could host a new cross platform three-hour breakfast show Monday to Friday on TV3, RadioLive and on line. Paul Henry launched on 7 April 2015 and initially had an audience larger than the two shows it replaced on radio and TV. For nine months in 2012, he also co-hosted an Australian television show, Breakfast, which ceased production on 30 November 2012, due to low ratings.

Early life
Paul Henry Hopes was born in Auckland, New Zealand, to Brian and Olive Hopes, on 4 August 1960.  He attended Cockle Bay Primary in Howick, Auckland.  His parents separated when he was 11, and in 1971 he moved with his English-born mother to Bristol, United Kingdom, where he finished his education and won a drama school scholarship.  Paul and his mother Olive lived in a council flat.  Olive worked triple shifts in a plastic bag factory to make ends meet. Henry says that when he was 25 he discovered that his grandmother was a "Gypsy".

Television and radio career

New Zealand
Henry commenced his broadcasting career working for the BBC, as a studio assistant and in the mail room. He worked as a projectionist in the natural history unit, where, according to the Sunday Star Times, "David Attenborough would come in and Henry would play the rushes". Henry returned to New Zealand when he was 19 and worked as a producer on National Radio.

From 1986 to 1990, Henry worked as a breakfast host on 2ZD Wairarapa. In 1991, Henry left 2ZD to establish rival radio station Today FM, hosting the station's breakfast show. Other notable Today FM staff included Hilary Pankhurst, Georgina Beyer, local identity Rick Long, and former 2ZD station manager John Shearer. In 1992, Henry sold the station to the owner of Port FM.

Henry went on to be a foreign correspondent and weekend talkback host for Radio Pacific, later presenting breakfast programme The Morning Grill with Arch Tambakis, then Pam Corkery. He also presented the station's drive program, and was the inaugural drive presenter at Radio Live when the station launched in 2005.

In 2004, Henry was appointed co-host of TV One's Breakfast. In 2009, ratings for the show had improved to around 150,000 viewers from a base of around 100,000. Between 2007 and 2008, Henry also presented episodes of This Is Your Life, and was a backup host for current affairs show Close Up. At the 2010 Qantas Film and Television Awards, Henry was awarded the People's Choice Award for Best Presenter. His acceptance speech attracted more than 300,000 views on YouTube.

In October 2010, Henry was forced to apologise and later resigned from TVNZ after controversy over his pronunciation and ridicule of the name of Indian politician Sheila Dikshit, as well as comments made about the then-Governor-General of New Zealand, Sir Anand Satyanand. In an interview the following month, Henry claimed that TVNZ, in particular chief executive Rick Ellis, had "capitalised" on him by encouraging him to be controversial on-air, adding that he believed it was wrong for the New Zealand Government to apologise to India for his remarks.

On 1 April 2011, MediaWorks New Zealand announced Henry would return to Radio Live in July, replacing Maggie Barry as the host of the station's drivetime show, a position he had held four years previously. His tenure in the role would this time last just over half a year; Henry moved to Australia the following year to host Network Ten's new morning show.

In 2011 Henry published an autobiography, What Was I Thinking. The book was a bestseller upon release. In 2013 he released another book, called Outraged also a bestseller. In late 2020 Henry released his third book, also a bestseller. ‘I’m in a United State’. Henry has released three vintages of Central Otago Pinot Noir. The last in 2020. All sold out within weeks.

Australia
In February 2012, Henry relocated to Sydney, Australia to co-host Network Ten's morning show Breakfast. The show debuted on 23 February 2012 to low ratings. As in New Zealand, Henry's on-air comments caused controversy: in May 2012 he suggested asylum seekers could stay in people's linen cupboards, and implied they were "dirty".

Due to low ratings, Henry's Breakfast was cancelled on 30 November 2012 after less than one year on air. During the show's broadcast period, one of Henry's co-hosts and the show's executive producer quit, prompting speculation about whether the departures were due to tension with Henry. A newspaper reported other staff at the network resented Henry, claiming many wouldn't look at him when he walked in the room, and were planning to boycott the Christmas party. Both Henry and the low ratings of the show were continually lampooned by the comedy show The Hamster Wheel.

Return to New Zealand and semi-retirement
Henry returned to New Zealand after Breakfast&apos;s cancellation. While in Australia, Henry maintained work in New Zealand media as an Australian correspondent for Radio Live and as the host of Would I Lie to You? on TV3. 

In late 2013 it was revealed that from 2014 Paul Henry would be hosting a late night current affairs show called The Paul Henry Show, which would replace the long-running Nightline. The Paul Henry Show lasted one year; in early October 2014 Henry was announced as the presenter for Mediaworks' new breakfast show to air simultaneously on TV3 and Radio Live. This new venture, entitled Paul Henry, replaces both TV3's Firstline and Marcus Lush's morning segment on Radio Live. In 2016, Henry departed Mediaworks and announced he would be entering a period of "semi-retirement", splitting his time between New Zealand and the United States, and producing wine.

Following the effects of the coronavirus pandemic in New Zealand, MediaWorks announced a new show hosted by Henry titled Rebuilding Paradise. The show ran over four weeks in April 2020 and featured live interviews in regards to the country's response to COVID-19. This is the first project Henry has taken part in since the announcement of this period of "semi-retirement".

Personal life
Henry is currently married to entrepreneur Diane Foreman.  He was previously married to Rachael Hopes (née Orsman), with whom he had three children.  Henry was also previously married to radio producer Linzi Dryburgh.

In 2014 it was reported in an interview that Henry was a nudist, which Henry has also stated on his show.

Political career
Henry ran as the National Party candidate for the Wairarapa electorate in the 1999 general election. He lost to former radio colleague and New Zealand Labour Party candidate Georgina Beyer by 3,033 votes.

Controversies

Female facial hair 
In March 2009, Henry caused offence by pointing out the facial hair of female guest anti-nuclear campaigner and Greenpeace worker Stephanie Mills. TVNZ stated that it had received a "handful" of complaints. Henry stated to the Sunday Star Times: "I certainly have no intention of apologising to people who have written in and complained. The key thing to me is what a fortunate life they must have that they can afford time and energy to complain about such an insignificant thing."

Views on homosexuality 
In August 2009, Henry referred to homosexuals as "unnatural", prompting a complaint to the Broadcasting Standards Authority, which regulates broadcast radio and television content within New Zealand. In February 2010, the Broadcasting Standards Authority declined to uphold the complaint.

Susan Boyle 
In November 2009, Henry sparked controversy when he called singer Susan Boyle 'retarded'. His comments led to almost 200 complaints to the Broadcasting Standards Authority and an apology from Television New Zealand.

Governor-General of New Zealand Sir Anand Satyanand 

In October 2010, Henry was again the subject of complaints after a live broadcast in which he asked Prime Minister John Key whether the Governor-General, Sir Anand Satyanand, was "even a New Zealander".  Henry went on to ask "Are you going to choose a New Zealander who looks and sounds like a New Zealander this time... are we going to go for someone who is more like a New Zealander this time?" Anand is of Indian descent but was born and raised in Auckland. Henry was criticised by Key, Labour leader Phil Goff and race relations commissioner Joris de Bres. Henry later apologised for his comments. After initially expressing its support for Henry, TVNZ announced the following day that it had suspended the presenter for two weeks without pay.

Sheila Dikshit 
Following the decision to suspend Henry, TVNZ continued to air a clip in which Henry referred to Delhi's chief minister Sheila Dikshit during the 2010 Commonwealth Games as "the dipshit woman" and pronouncing her surname as "Dick Shit" despite later being told it was "Dixit", going on to state that "it's so appropriate, because she's Indian, so she'd be dick-in-shit wouldn't she, do you know what I mean? Walking along the street... it's just so funny." An interview with Sheila Dikshit confirmed Henry's pronunciation was correct. In an interview with Sunrise, Henry claimed people in India also find the name humorous and that he thinks the “biggest insult” is deliberately mispronouncing someone’s name just because it sounds funny.

New Zealand Indian Central Association president Paul Singh Bains said the fact that TVNZ was still "promoting" the clip on its website showed it had "totally lost the plot" and was insensitive to the offence Henry had caused.
Following at least four complaints against the video, TVNZ removed it from the "Video extras" section of their website. Henry's resignation polarised the New Zealand public, with supporters claiming he was a victim of political correctness, and critics accusing him of pandering to the lowest common denominator. Henry later explained his resignation from TVNZ, saying, “there was a lot of stuff going down against Television New Zealand and I didn’t want to put them through that anymore.”

India summoned New Zealand's high commissioner Rupert Holborow to protest against Henry's "racist and bigoted" comments, and Holborow expressed his regret for the "deep hurt" they had caused.

Asylum seekers
On 16 May 2012, Henry was criticised for comments made on Breakfast regarding asylum seekers. When commenting on a newspaper article, about the Australian Government offering families money to house asylum seekers, Henry suggested that the idea could be "broadened out" saying: "I mean if this is all about saving money you could broaden it out. Why not criminals? Not murderers, but low level criminals. You could - the jails could be smaller and you could put them in homestay situations. The mentally ill". He later suggested the asylum seekers could be housed in linen cupboards. His remarks were featured on Media Watch.

Henry caused further controversy on 27 August 2012 by suggesting on the programme that asylum seekers should "starve to death" following reports that they would be conducting a hunger strike over plans to shift them to Nauru. He issued an apology the following morning following public backlash on Twitter.

See also
 List of New Zealand television personalities

References

External links

Paul Henry RadioLIVE host page

Timeline of Paul Henry controversies
Paul Henry AMA

1960 births
Living people
New Zealand people of English descent
New Zealand people of Romani descent
New Zealand National Party politicians
Australian television presenters
New Zealand television presenters
Unsuccessful candidates in the 1999 New Zealand general election
Radio Live
New Zealand journalists
New Zealand naturists
21st-century New Zealand politicians